Formetorex (INN), also known as formetamide or N-formylamphetamine, is a substituted amphetamine described as an anorectic which does not appear to have ever been marketed.

Formetorex is also an intermediate in the production of amphetamine by the "Leuckart reaction." It is also commonly found as an impurity in clandestine labs where this synthesis method is used. Due to the simplicity of the Leuckart reaction, it is the most popular synthetic route employed for the illicit manufacture of amphetamines.  The synthesis involves a non-metal reduction that is typically carried out in three steps.  For amphetamine synthesis, a mixture of phenylacetone and formamide (sometimes in the presence of formic acid) or ammonium formate, is heated until a condensation reaction results in the intermediate product, formetamide. In the second step, formetamide is hydrolysed using hydrochloric acid, and the reaction mixture is then basified, isolated, and steam distilled to produce the free base.  The final step, the product is dissolved in an organic solvent and precipitated as the sulphate salt of amphetamine by adding sulfuric acid.

References

External links
 

Substituted amphetamines
Amphetamine
Anorectics
Norepinephrine-dopamine releasing agents
Stimulants
Formamides